Chiltern District was one of four local government districts of Buckinghamshire in south central England from 1974 to 2020.  It was named after the Chiltern Hills on which the region sits.

The main towns in the district were Amersham and Chesham which are both served by London Underground's Metropolitan line.

History

It was formed on 1 April 1974 by the merger of the Chesham Urban District and surrounding Amersham Rural District. In 1988 it was the first Council to take up stock transfer. 4,650 homes were transferred.

The district was abolished on 31 March 2020 and its area is now part of the unitary Buckinghamshire Council.

Parishes
The parishes that made up Chiltern District were:

 Amersham
 Ashley Green
 Chalfont St Giles
 Chalfont St Peter
 Chartridge
 Chenies
 Chesham
 Chesham Bois
 Cholesbury-cum-St Leonards
 Coleshill
 Great Missenden
 Latimer
 Little Chalfont
 Little Missenden
 Penn
 Seer Green
 The Lee

See also the list of civil parishes in Buckinghamshire

Premises
Chiltern District Council was initially based at the former Amersham Rural District Council offices at Elmodesham House, 42 High Street, Amersham, with the former Chesham Urban District Council's offices at 8082 The Broadway, High Street, Chesham serving as additional office space. In 1986 the council consolidated its offices into a purpose-built headquarters on King George V Road in Amersham, remaining there until its abolition in 2020.

Transport 
Along with the Aylesbury Vale district, Chiltern contains no motorways except for a very small section of the M25 in the south-eastern corner. The major roads through the district are the A413 and the A404, the two meeting in Amersham. Railway services are provided by Chiltern Railways and London Underground's Metropolitan line. The Great Central Main Line carried traffic between London and Manchester until 1966, the section to Aylesbury is all that remains, and is now part of the London to Aylesbury Line. The railway stations in the district are; Great Missenden, Amersham, Chalfont and Latimer and Chesham, the furthest tube station from London.

Law and order
Chiltern District fell within the Thames Valley Police area, with police stations in Amersham and Chesham.

Neighbourhood policing priorities were set on a quarterly cycle, at a public meeting.  This was done in conjunction with Chiltern District Council's Community Safety Team and Chiltern Community Forum, and in line with the obligation to consult laid down by the Police Reform and Social Responsibility Act 2011.  In advance of the meeting, residents were invited to make their views and priorities known through a very short survey. Results from the survey were aggregated and presented at the meeting, and votes taken on the coming quarter's priorities.

The Magistrates' Court in Amersham was closed with its jurisdiction reassigned but reopened as a Crown Court dealing with either-way and more serious alleged offences.

Home ownership and quality of rural life
The district had the highest proportion of home ownership of the 18 local authorities in Bedfordshire, Buckinghamshire and Hertfordshire: combining the social (housing association and local authority provided) and private rented sectors, Stevenage's returns recorded in 2011 that its rented sector comprised 33.2% of its housing, whereas 10.0% of Chiltern's residents rented their homes.

In May 2008, the district was assessed by Bank of Scotland, Halifax division as having the best rural quality of life anywhere in Britain.

Energy consumption
In May 2006, a report commissioned by British Gas showed that housing in Chiltern produced the 4th highest average carbon emissions in the country at 7,421 kg of carbon dioxide per dwelling.

References

External links

List of organisations within the district

 
Former non-metropolitan districts
Non-metropolitan districts of Buckinghamshire
Districts of England established in 1974
2020 disestablishments in England